The 1965 Argentina rugby union tour of South Africa and Rhodesia  was a series of 16 matches played by the Argentina national team in May and June 1965 in Rhodesia and South Africa.

That tour was meaningful and relevant for Argentine rugby as it saw the birth of the team's nickname (Pumas), which has identified the national team since, following the victory over the Junior Springboks at Ellis Park. That win was considered historic not only for the Argentine national team but for the sport in the country.

The tour

In 1959, the Junior Springboks had toured to Argentina, where they played a series of friendly matches. The South Africans were impressed by the rugby environment in the country and their visit paved the way for the trip of the Argentine team. As a result, in 1964 the South African Rugby Union sent an invitation to the UAR to send a representative team there. The SARU wanted a foreign team to play there with the purpose of spreading the practise of rugby in South Africa.

South African Danie Craven served as adviser for the team to prepare the tour, while the SA Union sent Izak van Heerden to help the Argentine Rugby Union to prepare the tour and collaborate with coaches Alberto Camardón (main coach) and Angel Guastella (second coach).

The national team played a series of preparatory games before the tour, facing local clubs and provincial representatives such as Universitario (LP) Obras Sanitarias, Alumni, Newman, Córdoba RU, Rosario RU, Duendes and Old Georgian

The first two matches in South Africa were extremely hard for the Argentine squad, in disadvantage on the physical power and the tough play by their rivals. Nevertheless, Argentine players vowed themselves to change the history from then on. The "key game" of the tour was the match v. Southern Universities won by Argentina 22–6. The local media entitled "Argentina shattered the cradle of South African rugby" after that match.

Nevertheless, Argentina's most relevant victory was against the Junior Springboks – the South African second national team– to whom they defeated 11–6 at Ellis Park. Argentina lineup for that match was Cazenave, Neri, Pascual, Rodríguez Jurado, España; Poggi, Etchegaray; Loyola, Silva, Scharenberg; Schmidt, Otaño; Foster, González del Solar y García Yáñez. The photo showing centre Marcelo Pascual diving to the rival ingoal became iconic for Argentine rugby.

The Pumas nickname is the result of an error made by Carl Kohler, a journalist for the Die Transvaler newspaper in South Africa, while following the team during the tour. He tried to devise a catchy nickname for the team similar to existing international team nicknames such as All Blacks, Springboks, and Wallabies. Kohler was aware that the Americas had pumas, and as he was under pressure to submit his article, made a guess and called them "the Pumas", instead of the actual jaguar (which original name in Argentina is "yaguareté" but he refused to use that word as he was unable to utter it correctly).

The mistake stuck, and was eventually adopted by the Argentines themselves (although the UAR crest still depicts a jaguar).

Touring team
The Argentine squad was made up of 26 touring players:

 Walter Aniz
 Manuel Beccar Varela
 Juan Francisco Benzi
 Roberto Cazenave
 Jorge Dartiguelongue
 Eduardo España
 Adolfo Etchegaray
 Ronaldo Foster
 Luis García Yáñez
 Nicanor González del Solar
 Héctor Goti
 Luis Gradín
 Heriberto Handley
 José Luis Imhoff
 Guillermo Jiba
 Luis Loyola
 Guillermo Mc Cormick
 Enrico Neri
 Arturo Rodríguez Jurado
 Bernardo Otaño
 Marcelo Pascual
 Eduardo Poggi
 Héctor Silva
 Agustín Silveyra
 Eduardo Scharenberg
 Rodolfo Schmidt

Match summary
Complete list of matches played by Argentine in South Africa:
 Test matches 

Notes

Match details 

|}

Statistics

Most matches

Top scorers

Aftermath 
The tour is considered the birth of the modern "Pumas" because of the national team had not achieved great results until then. The victory v the Junior Springboks was widely covered by the Argentine media and it is considered a turning point for the national team.

In an interview for the 50th anniversary of the tour, Héctor Silva stated:

About the first matches, Heriberto Handley said in the same interview:

"Coco" Benzi added:

Bibliography

References

Argentina national rugby union team tours
1965
tour
rugby